Thomas, Tom or Tommy Kay may refer to:

Thomas B. Kay (1864–1931),  American politician and businessman
Tom Kay (footballer, born 1883) (1883–1934), English footballer for Bury
Tom Kay (footballer, born 1892) (1892–1940), English footballer for Stoke
Tom Kay (rower) (born 1969),  British lightweight rower.